Event: giant slalom qualification men

Date: 12 February 2007

1st run start time: 10:00 CET

2nd run start time: 13:30 CET

Information
This is the first time that the qualification race was organized at the World Championships due to the large number of participants. Top 50 athletes in the World Cup rankings qualified directly into the final. Other athletes competed in the qualification race where top 25 will qualify into the final.

Results

Notes 

Men's Giant Slalom Qualification